= Late Tang =

Late Tang may refer to:

- The later years of imperial China's Tang dynasty (618–907)
- Later Tang (923–937), a short-lived dynasty during imperial China's Five Dynasties and Ten Kingdoms period
